Tham Phannara is a district (amphoe) of Nakhon Si Thammarat province, southern Thailand.

Geography
Neighboring districts are (from the east clockwise): Chawang and Thung Yai of Nakhon Si Thammarat, and Phrasaeng and Wiang Sa of Surat Thani province.

History
The district was created as a minor district (king amphoe) on 1 April 1990, when the two tambons Tham Phannara and Khlong Se were split off from Chawang district. A first temporary district office was within Wat Tham Phannara, until the current office building was opened on 4 October 1993. On 7 September 1995 the minor district was upgraded to a full district.

Administration

Central administration 
Tham Phannara is subdivided into three subdistricts (tambons), which are further subdivided into 29 administrative villages (mubans).

Local administration 
There are three subdistrict administrative organizations (SAO) in the district:
 Tham Phannara consisting of subdistrict Tham Phannara.
 Khlong Se consisting of subdistrict Khlong Se.
 Dusit consisting of subdistrict Dusit.

References

External links
amphoe.com

Districts of Nakhon Si Thammarat province